Akova is a place name that may refer to:

 Akova Castle, a medieval castle in Arcadia, Greece
 Barony of Akova, a medieval Frankish lordship centred on Akova
 Akova, Argos, a settlement in the community and municipal unit of Argos, Greece
 Akova, Gülnar, a village in Gülnar district of Mersin Province, Turkey
 the Turkish name of Gypsou in Northern Cyprus